George Harvey may refer to:

 Sir George Harvey (painter) (1806–1876), Scottish painter
 George Harvey (British politician) (1870–1939), British Conservative MP for Kennington 1924–1929, 1931–1939
 George Harvey (sport shooter) (1878–1958), South African sport shooter
 George Harvey (cricketer) (1885–1962), Australian cricketer
 George Harvey (The Lovely Bones), fictional serial killer in Alice Sebold's 2002 novel The Lovely Bones
 George Brinton McClellan Harvey (1864–1928), American diplomat and journalist
 George Harvey Collegiate Institute, a high school in Toronto, Ontario, Canada
 George Isaac Harvey (1892–?), politician in the Canadian province of Ontario
 George Roy Harvey (1869–1935), American football coach
 George Harvey (American football) (born 1945), American football player
 George U. Harvey (1881–1946), borough president of Queens, New York City
 George Harvey (FRS) (died 1834), mathematician
 George Harvey (RAF officer) (1905–1969), British air marshal

See also
 George Harvie-Watt (1903–1989), British Conservative Party politician